Edaga Hamus or Idaga Hamus (Tigrigna "Thursday Market") may refer to:
 Idaga Hamus (Saesi Tsaedaemba), a town in the eastern zone of the Ethiopian [Tigray region
 Idaga Hamus (Tsegede), a village in the western zone of the Ethiopian Tigray region
 Edaga Hamus, Eritrea, a district of the Eritrean capital Asmara
 Edaga Hamus (Eritrean football club), a football club based in Edaga Hamus (district of Asmara)